South Asian Journal of Macroeconomics and Public Finance is a peer-reviewed journal that provides a forum  for discussion on issues relating to contemporary global macroeconomics and public finance.

This journal is a member of the Committee on Publication Ethics (COPE).

Abstracting and indexing 
 South Asian Journal of Macroeconomics and Public Finance is abstracted and indexed in:
 EBSCO: EconLit
 DeepDyve
 J-Gate
 Research Papers in Economics (RePEc)
 ProQuest: Worldwide Political Science Abstracts

External links
 
 Homepage

References
 http://publicationethics.org/members/south-asian-journal-macroeconomics-and-public-finance

SAGE Publishing academic journals
Biannual journals
Development studies journals
Economics journals
Publications established in 2012